Elizaveta Rogozhnikova (born 25 August 2004) is a Kyrgyzstani swimmer.

In 2018, she represented Kyrgyzstan at the 2018 Asian Games held in Jakarta, Indonesia without winning a medal.

In 2019, she represented Kyrgyzstan at the 2019 World Aquatics Championships held in Gwangju, South Korea. She competed in the women's 200 metre freestyle event and she did not advance to compete in the semi-finals. She also competed in the women's 200 metre backstroke event and in this event she also did not advance to the semi-finals.

References 

Living people
2004 births
Place of birth missing (living people)
Kyrgyzstani female backstroke swimmers
Kyrgyzstani female freestyle swimmers
Swimmers at the 2018 Asian Games
Asian Games competitors for Kyrgyzstan
21st-century Kyrgyzstani women